Megalodontes cephalotes  is a species of sawflies within the Symphyta belonging to the family Megalodontesidae.

Distribution and habitat
This species is restricted to the regions of Europe (Andorra, Austria, Belgium, Bosnia and Herzegovina, Bulgaria, Croatia, Czech Republic, France, Germany, Italy, North Macedonia, Poland, Romania, Russia, Slovakia, Slovenia, Spain, Switzerland, Yugoslavia). It is a typically mountainous and alpine species, but it is also present in the lowlands.

Description
These rather rare sawflies have a black glossy body with narrow light yellow bands on the abdomen. Pronotum shows a yellow upper margin. The head is large, the antennae are pectinate, with darkened flabelli towards the apex. The wings are reddish.

Biology
Adults can be found from May to July, mainly on white and yellow inflorescences. They feed on pollen, nectar and honeydew, while young larvae feed gregariously on a few flowering plants (Laserpitium, Seseli and Peucedanum species).

References

External links
 Aramel.free.fr
 natur-um-huettenfeld

Sawflies
Hymenoptera of Europe
Insects described in 1781
Taxa named by Johan Christian Fabricius